Daniel Chávez Morales (born 27 January 1966) is a Guatemalan former tennis player.

Chávez represented Guatemala at the 1987 Pan American Games and won a bronze medal in the men's doubles, with Fabio Sical. They were beaten in the semi-finals by eventual gold medalists Luke Jensen and Patrick McEnroe.

Debuting in 1990, Chávez featured in a total of 31 ties for the Guatemala Davis Cup team. He won 29 rubbers for his country, 12 in singles and 17 in doubles. His doubles win tally is a national record and includes nine partnering his brother Jacobo. In his final Davis Cup appearance in 2004 he also served as team captain.

In 2007 he was appointed to captain Guatemala in the Fed Cup.

References

External links
 
 
 

1966 births
Living people
Guatemalan male tennis players
Competitors at the 1986 Central American and Caribbean Games
Central American and Caribbean Games medalists in tennis
Central American and Caribbean Games silver medalists for Guatemala
Tennis players at the 1987 Pan American Games
Pan American Games medalists in tennis
Pan American Games bronze medalists for Guatemala
Medalists at the 1987 Pan American Games
20th-century Guatemalan people
21st-century Guatemalan people